This list of Alaska Native tribal entities names the federally recognized tribes in the state of Alaska.

The Alaska Native Claims Settlement Act of 1971 explains how these Alaska Native villages came to be tracked this way. This version was updated based on Federal Register, Volume 87, dated January 28, 2022 (87 FR 4638), when the number of Alaskan Native tribes entities totaled 231.

The list is maintained in alphabetical order with respect to the name of the tribe or village.

Note that while the names of Alaska Native tribal entities often include "Village of" or "Native Village of," in most cases, the tribal entity cannot be considered as identical to the city, town, or census-designated place in which the tribe is located, as some residents may be non-tribal members and a separate city government may exist. Nor should Alaska Native tribes be confused with Alaska Native Regional Corporations, which are a class of Alaska for-profit corporations created under the Alaska Native Claims Settlement Act (ANCSA) of 1971.



A

 Agdaagux Tribe of King Cove
 Akiachak Native Community
 Akiak Native Community
 Alatna Village
 Algaaciq Native Village (St. Mary's)
 Allakaket Village
 Alutiiq Tribe of Old Harbor, previously listed as Native Village of Old Harbor and Village of Old Harbor
 Angoon Community Association
 Anvik Village
 Arctic Village, see Native Village of Venetie Tribal Government
 Asa'carsarmiut Tribe

B
 Beaver Village
 Birch Creek Tribe

C
 Central Council of the Tlingit & Haida Indian Tribes
 Chalkyitsik Village
 Cheesh-Na Tribepreviously listed as Native Village of Chistochina
 Chevak Native Village
 Chickaloon Native Village
 Chignik Bay Tribal Councilpreviously listed as Native Village of Chignik
 Chignik Lake Village
 Chilkat Indian Village (Klukwan)
 Chilkoot Indian Association (Haines)
 Chinik Eskimo Community (Golovin)
 Chuloonawick Native Village
 Circle Native Community
 Craig Tribal Associationpreviously Craig Community Association
 Curyung Tribal Councilpreviously the Native Village of Dillingham

D
 Douglas Indian Association

E
 Egegik Village
 Eklutna Native Village
 Emmonak Village
 Evansville Village (aka Bettles Field)

F
None

G
 Galena Village (aka Louden Village)
 Gulkana Village Councilpreviously listed as Gulkana Village

H
 Healy Lake Village
 Holy Cross Tribepreviously listed as Holy Cross Village
 Hoonah Indian Association
 Hughes Village
 Huslia Village
 Hydaburg Cooperative Association

I
 Igiugig Village
 Inupiat Community of the Arctic Slope
 Iqugmiut Traditional Councilpreviously listed as Iqurmuit Traditional Council
 Ivanof Bay Tribepreviously listed as Ivanoff Bay Tribe and Ivanoff Bay Village

J
None

K
 Kaguyak Village
 Kaktovik Village (aka Barter Island)
 Kasigluk Traditional Elders Council
 Kenaitze Indian Tribe
 Ketchikan Indian Communitypreviously listed as Ketchikan Indian Corporation
 King Island Native Community
 King Salmon Tribe
 Klawock Cooperative Association
 Knik Tribe
 Kokhanok Village
 Koyukuk Native Village

L
 Levelock Village
 Lime Village

M
 Manley Hot Springs Village
 Manokotak Village
 McGrath Native Village
 Mentasta Traditional Council
 Metlakatla Indian Community, Annette Island Reserve

N
 Naknek Native Village
 Native Village of Afognak
 Native Village of Akhiok
 Native Village of Akutan
 Native Village of Aleknagik
 Native Village of Ambler
 Native Village of Atka
 Native Village of Atqasukpreviously listed as Atqasuk Village (Atkasook)
 Native Village of Barrow Inupiat Traditional Government
 Native Village of Belkofski
 Native Village of Brevig Mission
 Native Village of Buckland
 Native Village of Cantwell
 Native Village of Chenega (aka Chanega)
 Native Village of Chignik Lagoon
 Native Village of Chitina
 Native Village of Chuathbaluk (Russian Mission, Kuskokwim)
 Native Village of Council
 Native Village of Deering
 Native Village of Diomede (aka Inalik)
 Native Village of Eagle
 Native Village of Eek
 Native Village of Ekuk
 Native Village of Ekwokpreviously listed as Ekwok Village]]
 Native Village of Elim
 Native Village of Eyak (Cordova)
 Native Village of False Pass
 Native Village of Fort Yukon
 Native Village of Gakona
 Native Village of Gambell
 Native Village of Georgetown
 Native Village of Goodnews Bay
 Native Village of Hamilton
 Native Village of Hooper Bay
 Native Village of Kanatak
 Native Village of Karluk
 Native Village of Kiana
 Native Village of Kipnuk
 Native Village of Kivalina
 Native Village of Kluti Kaah (aka Copper Center)
 Native Village of Kobuk
 Native Village of Kongiganak
 Native Village of Kotzebue
 Native Village of Koyuk
 Native Village of Kwigillingok
 Native Village of Kwinhagak (aka Quinhagak)
 Native Village of Larsen Bay
 Native Village of Marshall (aka Fortuna Ledge)
 Native Village of Mary's Igloo
 Native Village of Mekoryuk
 Native Village of Minto
 Native Village of Nanwalek (aka English Bay)
 Native Village of Napaimute
 Native Village of Napakiak
 Native Village of Napaskiak
 Native Village of Nelson Lagoon
 Native Village of Nightmute
 Native Village of Nikolski
 Native Village of Noatak
 Native Village of Nuiqsut (aka Nooiksut)
 Native Village of Nunam Iquapreviously listed as Native Village of Sheldon's Point
 Native Village of Nunapitchuk
 Native Village of Ouzinkie
 Native Village of Paimiut
 Native Village of Perryville
 Native Village of Pilot Point
 Native Village of Point Hope
 Native Village of Point Lay
 Native Village of Port Graham
 Native Village of Port Heiden
 Native Village of Port Lions
 Native Village of Ruby
 Native Village of Saint Michael
 Native Village of Savoonga
 Native Village of Scammon Bay
 Native Village of Selawik
 Native Village of Shaktoolik
 Native Village of Shishmaref
 Native Village of Shungnak
 Native Village of Stevens
 Native Village of Tanacross
 Native Village of Tanana
 Native Village of Tatitlek
 Native Village of Tazlina
 Native Village of Teller
 Native Village of Tetlin
 Native Village of Tuntutuliak
 Native Village of Tununak
 Native Village of Tyonek
 Native Village of Unalakleet
 Native Village of Unga
 Native Village of Venetie Tribal Government (Arctic Village and Village of Venetie)
 Native Village of Wales
 Native Village of White Mountain
 Nenana Native Association
 New Koliganek Village Council
 New Stuyahok Village
 Newhalen Village
 Newtok Village
 Nikolai Village
 Ninilchik Village
 Nome Eskimo Community
 Nondalton Village
 Noorvik Native Community
 Northway Village
 Nulato Village
 Nunakauyarmiut Tribe

O
 Organized Village of Grayling (aka Holikachuk)
 Organized Village of Kake
 Organized Village of Kasaan
 Organized Village of Kwethluk
 Organized Village of Saxman
 Orutsararmiut Traditional Native Councilpreviously listed as Orutsararmuit Native Village (aka Bethel)
 Oscarville Traditional Village

P
 Pauloff Harbor Village
 Pedro Bay Village
 Petersburg Indian Association
 Pilot Station Traditional Village
 Pitka's Point Traditional Councilpreviously listed as Native Village of Pitka's Point
 Platinum Traditional Village
 Portage Creek Village (aka Ohgsenakale)
 Pribilof Islands Aleut Communities of St. Paul & St. George Islands (Saint George Island and Saint Paul Island)

Q
 Qagan Tayagungin Tribe of Sand Pointpreviously listed as Qagan Tayagungin Tribe of Sand Point Village
 Qawalangin Tribe of Unalaska

R
 Rampart Village

S
 Saint George IslandSee Pribilof Islands Aleut Communities of St. Paul & St. George Islands
 Saint Paul IslandSee Pribilof Islands Aleut Communities of St. Paul & St. George Islands
 Salamatof Tribepreviously listed as Village of Salamatoff
 Seldovia Village Tribe
 Shageluk Native Village
 Sitka Tribe of Alaska
 Skagway Village
 South Naknek Village
 Stebbins Community Association
 Sun'aq Tribe of Kodiakpreviously listed as Shoonaq' Tribe of Kodiak

T
 Takotna Village
 Tangirnaq Native Villagepreviously listed as Lesnoi Village (aka Woody Island)
 Telida Village
 Traditional Village of Togiak
 Tuluksak Native Community
 Twin Hills Village

U
 Ugashik Village
 Umkumiut Native Villagepreviously listed as Umkumiute Native Village

V
 Village of Alakanuk
 Village of Anaktuvuk Pass
 Village of Aniak
 Village of Atmautluak
 Village of Bill Moore's Slough
 Village of Chefornak
 Village of Clarks Point
 Village of Crooked Creek
 Village of Dot Lake
 Village of Iliamna
 Village of Kalskag
 Village of Kaltag
 Village of Kotlik
 Village of Lower Kalskag
 Village of Ohogamiut
 Village of Red Devil
 Village of Sleetmute
 Village of Solomon
 Village of Stony River
 Village of Venetiesee Native Village of Venetie Tribal Government
 Village of Wainwright

W
 Wrangell Cooperative Association

X
None

Y
 Yakutat Tlingit Tribe
 Yupiit of Andreafski

Z
None

See also

 Alaska Native corporation
 Native Americans in the United States
 List of federally recognized tribes in the United States, Lower 48
 List of federally recognized tribes by state, Lower 48
 List of Indian reservations in the United States
 List of historical Indian reservations in the United States
 State-recognized tribes in the United States
 List of unrecognized tribes in the United States
 Circumpolar peoples
 Indigenous peoples of the Subarctic
 Indigenous peoples of the Pacific Northwest Coast
Federal recognition of Native Hawaiians
Legal status of Hawaii
 List of First Nations governments
 List of First Nations peoples
 List of Indian reserves in Canada

References

Federal Registers 
Federal Registers containing the "Indian Entities Recognized and Eligible To Receive Services From the United States Bureau of Indian Affairs" to which "Federally recognized tribes" and "List of Alaska Native Tribal Entities" derive their listings. To view the Federal Register, please visit The Federal Register page of the GPO.

Current version
 "Indian Entities Recognized by and Eligible To Receive Services From the United States Bureau of Indian Affairs," Federal Register, January 28, 2022

Former versions
 "Indian Entities Recognized by and Eligible To Receive Services From the United States Bureau of Indian Affairs," Federal Register, January 29, 2021
 Federal Register, Volume 78, Number 87 dated May 6, 2013 (
 Federal Register, Volume 77, Number 155 dated August 10, 2012
 Federal Register, Volume 75, Number 190 dated October 1, 2010, with a supplemental listing published in Federal Register, Volume 75, Number 207 dated October 27, 2010
 Federal Register, Volume 74, Number 153 dated August 11, 2009
 Federal Register, Volume 73, Number 66 dated April 4, 2008
 Federal Register, Volume 72, Number 55 dated March 22, 2007
 Federal Register, Volume 70, Number 226 dated November 25, 2005
 Federal Register, Volume 68, Number 234 dated December 5, 2003
 Federal Register, Volume 67, Number 134 dated July 12, 2002
 Federal Register, Volume 65, Number 49 dated March 13, 2000
 Federal Register, Volume 63, Number 250 dated December 30, 1998
 Federal Register, Volume 62, Number 205 dated October 23, 1997
 Federal Register, Volume 61, Number 220 dated November 13, 1996
 Federal Register, Volume 60, Number 32 dated February 16, 1995

 Federal Register, Volume 58, Number 202 dated October 21, 1993
 Federal Register, Volume 53, Number 250 dated December 29, 1988
 Federal Register, Volume 47, Number 227 dated November 24, 1982 – First time listing that includes native entities within the state of Alaska
 Federal Register, Volume 44, Number 26 dated February 6, 1979 – First listing of Indian tribal entities within the contiguous 48 states

 
 
Alaska Native
Alaska Native Tribal Entities